John Yorke (1685 – 1757), of Gouthwaite Hall and Richmond, Yorkshire, was an English Whig politician, who sat in the House of Commons between 1710 and 1757 with two short intervals.

Yorke was baptized on 16 December 1685, the son of Thomas Yorke (1658-1716), MP for Richmond between 1689 and 1716, and his wife Katherine Lister.  He was educated at Eton College and was admitted at Peterhouse, Cambridge.

Yorke was returned as Whig Member of Parliament  for Richmond constituency on his father's interest at the 1710 British general election. He was inactive, but voted against the French commerce bill on 18 June 1713. At the 1713 British general election he stood down in favour of his father who was expecting tough competition at Richmond. After his father's death in 1716 he was again elected as MP for Richmond at a by-election on 5 March 1717.  He served as an independent Whig.  He lost his seat at the 1727 British general election, but petitioned the House of Lords and was declared the winner in 1728. He retained his seat until his death.

On his father's death Yorke inherited the family estates in Nidderdale and Richmond.  In 1732 he married Anne Darcy, daughter of James Darcy, who had served as MP for Richmond with John's father.
 
Yorke died childless in 1757 and was buried in Richmond parish church. The family seat of Gouthwaite Hall in Nidderdale was later submerged under Gouthwaite Reservoir, although a new Gouthwaite Hall was rebuilt before inundation with materials from the old house.

References

Further reading 

Members of the Parliament of Great Britain for English constituencies
British MPs 1710–1713
British MPs 1715–1722
British MPs 1722–1727
British MPs 1727–1734
British MPs 1734–1741
British MPs 1741–1747
British MPs 1747–1754
British MPs 1754–1761
1685 births
1757 deaths
People from Nidderdale
People from Richmond, North Yorkshire
People educated at Eton College
Alumni of Peterhouse, Cambridge